Ilya Igorevich Knyazhuk (born 2 August 2000) is a Russian pair skater. With his current partner, Natalia Khabibullina, he is the 2021 JGP Austria champion, the 2021 JGP Russia silver medalist, and the 2022 Russian junior national champion.

Personal life 
Knyazhuk was born on 2 August 2000 in Moscow, Russia.

Career

2021–22 season: International junior debut 
Khabibullina/Knyazhuk made their international junior debut in September at the 2021 JGP Russia. They placed second in both the short program and the free skate to take the silver medal overall behind compatriots Ekaterina Chikmareva / Matvei Ianchenkov. At their second assignment, the 2021 JGP Austria in October, the team set new personal bests in both segments of competition, as well as overall, to take the title ahead of Russian teammates Anastasia Mukhortova / Dmitry Evgenyev and Georgian pair Karina Safina / Luka Berulava. Their placements across their two events qualified them to the 2021–22 Junior Grand Prix Final as the second-seeded team of four, but the event was later canceled due to concerns related to the discovery of the Omicron variant.

Khabibullina/Knyazhuk next made their debut at the senior-level Russian Championships in December. The team placed ninth in the short program and eighth in the free skate to finish seventh overall due to shifting ordinals. They were the highest-ranked of the teams competing internationally as juniors.

At the 2022 Russian Junior Championships the following month, Khabibullina/Knyazhuk narrowly won the title over Iuliia Artemeva / Mikhail Nazarychev with a strong free skate performance after placing second to the rival team in the short program.

Programs

With Khabibullina

Competitive highlights 
JGP: Junior Grand Prix

With Khabibullina

Detailed results 

With Khabibullina

 Senior results

References 

2000 births
Living people
Russian male pair skaters
Figure skaters from Moscow